1781 in philosophy

Events

Publications 
 Immanuel Kant, Critique of Pure Reason (1781)

Births 
 January 30 Adelbert von Chamisso (died 1838)
 May 6 - Karl Christian Friedrich Krause (died 1832)
 October 5 - Bernard Bolzano (died 1848)

Deaths 
 February 15 - Gotthold Ephraim Lessing (born 1729)

References 

Philosophy
18th-century philosophy
Philosophy by year